Inscriptional Pahlavi is a Unicode block containing monumental inscription characters for writing Middle Persian.

History
The following Unicode-related documents record the purpose and process of defining specific characters in the Inscriptional Pahlavi block:

References 

Unicode blocks